Michael Gerber may refer to:

Michael Gerber (non-fiction writer) (born 1936), American non-fiction writer known for the E-Myth series of books
Michael Gerber (parodist) (born 1969), American fiction and humor writer known for his Harry Potter parody, Barry Trotter
Michael Gerber (actor), German actor, as seen in Lichter
Michael F. Gerber (born 1972), American politician
Michael Gerber (bishop), German Roman Catholic bishop 
Mike Gerber (born 1992), American professional baseball player